Richard Day may refer to:

Richard J. F. Day (born c. 1964), professor of sociology and cultural studies at Queen's University, Canada, scholar-activist
Richard Day (printer) (1552–before 1607), English printer and clergyman
Richard R. Day, professor of language learning at the University of Hawaii
Richard Day (writer), American film and television writer, producer and director
Richard Day (art director) (1896–1972), Canadian art director
Dick Day (born 1937), American politician
Dick Day (footballer) (born 1920), former Australian rules footballer
Richard Digby Day (born 1941), British stage director
Richard W. Day (1916–1978), principal of Phillips Exeter Academy